Tongdŏk station is a railway station in greater Tanch'ŏn city, South Hamgyŏng province, North Korea, on the Kŭmgol Line of the Korean State Railway. It was opened on 30 March 1943 along with the rest of the Yŏhaejin–Tongam section of the line. Originally called Hamnam Kwangch'ŏn station (Chosŏn'gŭl: 함남광천역, Hanja: 咸南広泉駅), it received its current name in 1945.

References

Railway stations in North Korea
Railway stations opened in 1943
1943 establishments in Korea